OML 29 is also known as Oil Mining Licence 29. Oil Mining Licence OML is one of the two types of licences issued to oil producers in Nigeria "with validity periods ranging from 5 to 20 years respectively." OML29 is a large block located in the southeastern Niger Delta containing 11 oil and gas fields. OML29 stretches over an area of 983 square kilometres. It includes the Nembe Oil Field, Santa Barbara Oil Field and Okoroba Oil Fields. It also include related facilities like the Nembe Creek Trunk Line NCTL. A 100 kilometres long pipeline with a capacity of 600 thousand barrels per day.

Historical overview 
The initial lease was granted by the Federal Government of Nigeria to Shell Petroleum Development Company in 1964 and renewed after twenty-five (25) years in July 1989, for a term of thirty (30) years expiring in June 2019. OML29 licence was formally held by Shell Petroleum Development Company of Nigeria Ltd Joint Venture (SPDC), comprising Total E&P Nigeria Limited and Nigerian Agip Oil Company Limited.

In September 2015, Aiteo Eastern Exploration and Production (E&P) Company Limited, a subsidiary of Aiteo Group announced their acquisition of (OML) 29 and the Nembe Creek Trunk Line (NCTL) and related facilities in the Eastern Niger Delta from the Shell Petroleum Development Company of Nigeria Limited (SPDC) at $1.7 billion.

Production

OML29 produced around 43,000 barrels of oil equivalent per day (100 per cent) in 2014.

References 

Oil fields of Nigeria